Nonanone may refer to:

 2-Nonanone
 3-Nonanone
 4-Nonanone
 5-Nonanone

Nonanones